The Birdmen, also known as Escape of the Birdmen and Colditz: Escape of the Birdmen, is a 1971 television film directed by Philip Leacock and starring Doug McClure and René Auberjonois. It was a fictionalized account based on a proposed scheme for prisoners of war to escape from Colditz Castle by a clandestinely constructed glider christened the Colditz Cock. The film appeared on the ABC Movie of the Week on September 18, 1971. The film was shot at Universal Studios Hollywood and released theatrically in several countries.

Plot
O.S.S. agent Major Cook is assigned to take Halden Brevik, a Norwegian scientist with knowledge about the atomic bomb, out of occupied Europe to the Allies. The pair are captured, but their cover story, that they are escaped Allied air force prisoners of war, is believed by the Germans, and they are sent to the "escape-proof" Beckstadt Castle. Cook plots escape, while keeping the scientist's true identity from both the Germans and his fellow prisoners.

Cook comes up with an escape plan to fly out of the castle all the way to nearby Switzerland. A glider is built in secret in an attic, which will be able to take two men out. With the Germans closing in, Cook has to reveal Brevik's true identity and importance to the other prisoners in order that Brevik be one of the escapees. The other P.O.W.'s suspect Cook of lying to them, but fortunately one of them turns out to be a commando who had been captured (and also blinded) during the failed attempt to extract Brevik from Norway; he confirms Brevik's identity. Cook gets injured and cannot fly the glider, so he gives up his seat to Colonel Crawford, his strongest doubter, who hitherto he has had a strained relationship with. The prisoners knock out a wall and, with Crawford piloting, successfully launch the glider.

Cast
 Doug McClure as Major Harry Cook
 René Auberjonois as Halden Brevik / Olav Volda
 Richard Basehart as Kommandant Schiller
 Max Baer Jr. as Tanker
 Chuck Connors as Colonel Morgan Crawford
 Don Knight as Major Tovar
 Greg Mullavey as Sparrow
 Paul Koslo as Davies
 Barry Brown as Donnelly
 Tom Skerritt as Orville Fitzgerald

Soundtrack
 "Die Gedanken sind frei"

Notes

References
 

1971 films
ABC Movie of the Week
Films about nuclear war and weapons
Films directed by Philip Leacock
Films scored by David Rose
Universal Pictures films
World War II prisoner of war films
1970s English-language films
World War II television films